The 1941 Major League Baseball season was contested from April 14 to October 6, 1941. The Brooklyn Dodgers and New York Yankees were the regular season champions of the National League and American League, respectively. The Yankees then defeated the Dodgers in the World Series, four games to one.

In addition to a five-game World Series between New York City teams, highlights of the season included Ted Williams batting .406, and Joe DiMaggio having a 56-game hitting streak; it has been called the "best baseball season ever".

Awards and honors
MLB Most Valuable Player Award
Joe DiMaggio, New York Yankees, OF
Dolph Camilli, Brooklyn Dodgers, 1B
The Sporting News Most Valuable Player Award
Joe DiMaggio, New York Yankees, OF
Dolph Camilli, Brooklyn Dodgers, 1B
The Sporting News Player of the Year Award
Ted Williams (AL) – OF, Boston Red Sox
The Sporting News Manager of the Year Award
Billy Southworth (NL) – St. Louis Cardinals

Statistical leaders

Standings

American League

National League

Postseason

Bracket

Managers

American League

National League

Home field attendance

References

Further reading

External links
1941 Major League Baseball season schedule at Baseball Reference

 
Major League Baseball seasons